The Zuiweng Pavilion is a pavilion lying to the south east of Chuzhou City, Anhui Province, People's Republic of China. Located in The Northern Song Dynasty whilst the structure that exists today dates to the Qing Dynasty (1644–1911). The pavilion takes its name from the Northern Song poet Ouyang Xiu, who called himself the "Old Toper" and wrote a poem entitled Zuiweng Tingji or An Account of the Old Toper's Pavilion.

References

Buildings and structures in Anhui
Tourist attractions in Anhui